Rab11 family-interacting protein 2 is a protein that in humans is encoded by the RAB11FIP2 gene.

Interactions
RAB11FIP2 has been shown to interact with MYO5B, RAB11A and RAB25.

References

Further reading

External links